A number of steamships were named Eleni, including:
, a British cargo ship bombed and sunk during the Spanish Civil War
, a Greek cargo ship in service 1959–71

Ship names